Yendon is a small town in Victoria, Australia. The town was originally called Buninyong East, but was changed in 1879 to Yendon, believed to be an Indigenous Australian word meaning "waterhole".

History
The Geelong-Ballarat railway line passed through Yendon, and for a while in the early 1860s it was the terminus of the line. The station was originally called Buninyong, but was changed to Yendon in 1876. A substantial two-storey bluestone station building was opened in 1862. It was demolished in 1969, and the stone was reused to construct garden retaining walls at the Ballarat Institute of Advanced Education, now Federation University.

Yendon's first school, the Common School, opened in 1864, and became Yendon State School in 1879. It closed at the end of 1993.

References

External links
 Drawing of the Yendon Railway Station

Towns in Victoria (Australia)